Qeshlaq-e Qaravgholi Jabar (also Romanized as Qeshlāq-e Qarāvgholī Jabār) is a village in Qeshlaq-e Shomali Rural District, in the Central District of Parsabad County, Ardabil Province, Iran. At the 2006 census, its population was 102, in 19 families.

References 

Towns and villages in Parsabad County